Mammillaria microthele is a species of plant in the family Cactaceae. It is endemic to Mexico.  Its natural habitat is hot deserts. It is threatened by habitat loss. This species is sometimes considered a subspecies of Mammillaria formosa.

References

microthele
Cacti of Mexico
Endemic flora of Mexico
Endangered plants
Taxonomy articles created by Polbot